Imiołki  is a village in the administrative district of Gmina Kiszkowo, within Gniezno County, Greater Poland Voivodeship, in west-central Poland. On January 1, 2013 a portion of the village became a new village called Pola Lednickie.

The village has a population of 80.

References

Villages in Gniezno County